Tacna Locomotive park, (Parque de la Locomotora) is a park, located in the center of the city of Tacna, Peru.

There is an old train in the park.

Train History
The train was built to house the hundred year old. And the model is Engine Number 3.

In 1859, the train was built in Pennsylvania.

In 1879, during the war with Chile, the train was carried Peruvian troops to defend the Arica hill.

And during the Chilean occupation, continued working between Tacna and Arica.

In 1940, it broke down.

In 1977, repaired and put into the park.

Location
Avenida Grau

References
Notes

 i Peru(2014), "Informacion de Tacna".

Geography of Tacna Region
Tourist attractions in Tacna Region
Parks in Peru